Cheyenne Transit is the primary provider of mass transportation in Laramie County, Wyoming. Six routes are provided by the agency from Monday through Saturday. In 2009, the city began a comprehensive process to increase ridership by adding bus stops and building shelters.

History

Future

Services
As of 2020, Cheyenne's current fixed-routes include:
East Route- to East Walmart
Northwest Route- to Frontier Mall
Northeast Route- to King Soopers 
West Route- to BLM
South Route- LCCC
Downtown Loop to CRMC

Each route begins at the top of the hour at the Transfer Station (17th and Capitol), and makes a loop to return between 40 and 50 minutes past the hour. Each route is identified with a basic marquee on the front and right side of each bus. Each stop is identified with a green sign.

Para-transit
The "curb-to curb" program is a dial-up transit taxi for the disabled, or those not close to a bus stop. The para-transit runs on the same time-frame of a fixed-route, and within a 3/4th mile buffer.

Fleet

See also
 Buses
 Bus transit in the US

References

Bus transportation in Wyoming
Transportation in Cheyenne, Wyoming
Transportation in Laramie County, Wyoming